This is a list of some of the more well-known paintings of French artist Édouard Manet (1832–1883).

List

External links 
 Manet overview pages at museum web sites with collection databases:
 Art Institute of Chicago
 Barnes Foundation
 Bridgestone Museum of Art, Tokyo
 Foundation E.G. Bührle
 Guggenheim
 J. Paul Getty Museum
 Metropolitan Museum of Art
 Musee d'Orsay
 Museu de Arte de São Paulo 
 Museum of Fine Arts, Boston
 National Gallery, London
 National Gallery of Art, Washington, D.C.
 National Gallery of Victoria
 National Museum Cardiff
 National Museum of Western Art, Tokyo
 Philadelphia Museum of Art
 Google Art Project

Manet, Edouard